Nicolás Mazzarino (born October 21, 1975, in Salto) is a former Uruguayan professional basketball player, and current assistant coach for Club Biguá de Villa Biarritz of the Liga Uruguaya de Básquetbol. He also holds an Italian passport. At a height of 1.83 m (6'0") tall, he played the point guard and shooting guard positions.

Professional career
Mazzarino began his professional career in the Uruguayan club Hebraica y Macabi in 1991. In this club, Mazzarino won the Uruguayan Federal Championship title in 1994. In 1997, he moved to C.A. Welcome, another Uruguayan basketball team, where he won 4 consecutive Uruguayan Federal Championships. In 2001, Mazzarino played a brief time in the Argentinian League team C.A. Boca Juniors, but then he returned to C.A. Welcome.

In 2001, he moved to the Italian League, to play in Viola Reggio Calabria, where he became the team's captain and best scorer in the 2004–05 season.

After that season, he moved to Pallacanestro Cantù. In the 2007–08 season, he became the captain of Cantù. His best season with Cantù was the 2009–10 season, when he helped Cantù make it to the Italian League semifinals, after averaging 13.8 points and 2.8 assists per game.

In 2013, he returned to Uruguay, and began playing at Club Malvín. With the team, he won the Uruguayan Basketball League championship in 2014, 2015, and 2018.

National team career
Mazzarino played with the senior Uruguayan national team from 1997 to 2014. He played with Uruguay at 6 FIBA South American Championships (1997, 1999, 2001, 2004, 2008, 2014), 6 FIBA AmeriCups (1997, 1999, 2001, 2003, 2005, 2007, 2013), and 3 Pan American Games (1999, 2003, and 2007).

References

External links
Euroleague.net Profile
FIBA Profile
FIBA Europe Profile
Latinbasket.com Profile
Draftexpress.com Profile
Italian League Profile 

1975 births
Living people
Basketball players at the 1999 Pan American Games
Basketball players at the 2003 Pan American Games
Basketball players at the 2007 Pan American Games
Boca Juniors basketball players
Club Atlético Welcome basketball players
Club Malvín basketball players
Uruguayan expatriate basketball people in Argentina
Italian men's basketball players
Pallacanestro Cantù players
Pan American Games bronze medalists for Uruguay
Pan American Games medalists in basketball
Sportspeople from Salto, Uruguay
Point guards
Shooting guards
Uruguayan men's basketball players
Uruguayan people of Italian descent
Viola Reggio Calabria players
Medalists at the 2007 Pan American Games